Dess may refer to :
 Dess–Martin periodinane, a chemical reagent used to oxidize primary alcohols to aldehydes and secondary alcohols to ketones
 Albert Dess (born 1947), German politician and member of the European Parliament for Bavaria
 Darrell Dess (born 1935), former American football guard in the National Football League for the New York Giants
 Zachary Dess (born 1993), known professionally as Two Feet, American singer, songwriter, and producer

DESS may refer to :
 Distributed energy storage system, batteries connected to the electrical grid
 Diplôme d'études supérieures spécialisées, a former French graduate degree

See also